All the World's Delights (Swedish: All jordens fröjd) is a 1953 Swedish historical drama film directed by Rolf Husberg and starring Ulla Jacobsson, Birger Malmsten and Kenne Fant. It is based on the 1946 novel of the same title by Margit Söderholm.

The film's sets were designed by the art director Nils Nilsson.

Cast
 Ulla Jacobsson as Lisbet Enarsdotter 
 Birger Malmsten as Mats Eliasson 
 Kenne Fant as Erik Ersson 
 Solveig Hedengran as Ester 
 Lars Elldin as Jerker Enarsson 
 Carl Ström as Grandpa 
 Edla Rothgardt as Grandma 
 Gösta Cederlund as Germundsfar 
 Wiktor Andersson as Byskräddare 
 Erik 'Bullen' Berglund as Ålderman 
 Märta Dorff as Anna 
 Gerd Ericsson as Fkicka i Mårtensgården 
 Albin Erlandzon as Slaktare 
 Gustaf Färingborg as Larsson, länsman 
 Gösta Ganner as Lasse 
 Gösta Gustafson as Jonke 
 Haide Göransson as Karin Larsson 
 Amy Jelf as Bonddotter 
 Torsten Lilliecrona as Mickel 
 Signe Lundberg-Settergren as Lisbets släkting 
 Ninni Löfberg as Brita 
 Wilma Malmlöf as Klok-Anna 
 Karin Miller as Bonddotter 
 Aurore Palmgren as Ingemarsmor 
 Ulf Qvarsebo as Anders Ersson 
 Olav Riégo as Prost 
 Emy Storm as Brud på Mårtensgården 
 Bengt Sundmark as Halvar

References

Bibliography
 Per Olov Qvist & Peter von Bagh. Guide to the Cinema of Sweden and Finland. Greenwood Publishing Group, 2000.

External links 
 

1953 films
1950s historical drama films
Swedish historical drama films
1950s Swedish-language films
Films directed by Rolf Husberg
Films based on Swedish novels
Films set in the 1850s
1953 drama films
Swedish black-and-white films
1950s Swedish films